The 1999 World Junior Figure Skating Championships were held in Zagreb, Croatia between November 21 and 29, 1998. Younger figure skaters competed for the title of World Junior Champion. Due to the large number of participants, the men's and ladies' qualifying groups were split into groups A and B.

It was the last World Junior Figure Skating Championships to be held in the fall. After the 1999 Championships (which were called such even though they took place in the fall of 1998), the event was moved to the spring.

Medals table

Results

Men

Ladies

Pairs

Ice dancing

References

External links
 

World Junior Figure Skating Championships
World Junior Figure Skating Championships, 1999
F
World Junior 1999
Sports competitions in Zagreb
World Junior Figure Skating Championships 1999
1990s in Zagreb